Alibaba Group Holding Limited, also known as Alibaba, is a Chinese multinational technology company specializing in e-commerce, retail, Internet, and technology. Founded on 28 June 1999 in Hangzhou, Zhejiang, the company provides consumer-to-consumer (C2C), business-to-consumer (B2C), and business-to-business (B2B) sales services via web portals, as well as electronic payment services, shopping search engines, and cloud computing services. It owns and operates a diverse portfolio of companies around the world in numerous business sectors.

On 19 September 2014, Alibaba's initial public offering (IPO) on the New York Stock Exchange raised US$25 billion, giving the company a market value of US$231 billion and, by far, then the largest IPO in world history. It is one of the top 10 most valuable corporations, and is named the 31st-largest public company in the world on the Forbes Global 2000 2020 list. In January 2018, Alibaba became the second Asian company to break the US$500 billion valuation mark, after its competitor Tencent. , Alibaba has the sixth-highest global brand valuation.

Alibaba is one of the world's largest retailers and e-commerce companies. In 2020, it was also rated as the fifth-largest artificial intelligence company. It is also one of the biggest venture capital firms and investment corporations in the world, as well as the second largest financial services group behind Visa via its fintech arm Ant Group. The company hosts the largest B2B (Alibaba.com), C2C (Taobao), and B2C (Tmall) marketplaces in the world. It has been expanding into the media industry, with revenues rising by triple percentage points year after year. It also set the record on the 2018 edition of China's Singles' Day, the world's biggest online and offline shopping day.

Naming 
The company's name came from the character Ali Baba from the Middle Eastern folk-tale collection One Thousand and One Nights because of its universal appeal. As Jack Ma, one of the founders, replied to Lorraine Hahn on TalkAsia:

History
On 28 June 1999, Jack Ma, with 17 friends and students founded Alibaba.com, a China-based B2B marketplace site, in his Hangzhou apartment. In October 1999, Alibaba received a US$25 million investment from Swedish Wallenberg family's Investor AB, Goldman Sachs and SoftBank. In 1999, Wallenbergs Investor AB owned 6% of the shares. Alibaba.com was expected to improve the domestic e-commerce market and perfect an e-commerce platform for Chinese enterprises, especially small and medium-sized enterprises (SMEs), to help export Chinese products to the global market as well as to address World Trade Organization (WTO) challenges. In 2002, Alibaba.com became profitable three years after launch. Ma wanted to improve the global e-commerce system, so from 2003 onward, Alibaba launched Taobao Marketplace, Alipay, Alimama.com, and Lynx.

When eBay announced its expansion into China in 2003, Ma viewed the American company as a foreign competitor and rejected eBay's buyout of Alibaba's subsidiary Taobao. By applying existing technologies, gaining trust in the Chinese e-commerce market, and expanding through dominating the market at a loss before making a return on additional services, Alibaba's subsidiaries outperformed eBay in the Chinese e-commerce market, claiming a growing percentage of consumers from eBay. Alibaba subsidiary Taobao would later force eBay out of the Chinese market, with eBay closing its unprofitable China Web unit, though the two companies would break even six years later.

In 2005, Yahoo! invested in Alibaba through a variable interest entity (VIE) structure, buying a 40% stake in the company for US$1 billion. This would as a result net in US$10 billion in Alibaba's IPO alone to Yahoo!.

According to Li Chuan, a senior executive at Alibaba, the company was planning in 2013 to open traditional brick and mortar retail outlets in partnership with Wanda Group, a Chinese real estate company. Additionally, Alibaba purchased a 25% stake in Hong Kong-listed Chinese department store chain Intime Retail in early 2014. In early 2017, Alibaba and Intime's founder Shen Guojun agreed to pay as much as HK$19.8 billion (US$2.6 billion) to take the store chain private. Alibaba's stake—28% from 2014's US$692 million investment—would rise to about 74% after the deal.

In April 2014, Alibaba invested in Lyft, along with Coatue Management, and Andreessen Horowitz; they led a US$250 million Series D financing round. On 5 June 2014, Alibaba bought a 50% stake of Guangzhou Evergrande F.C. from Evergrande Real Estate Group Ltd. in a deal that was worth 1.2 billion yuan (US$192 million). On 5 September 2014, the group—in a regulatory filing with the US Securities and Exchange Commission (SEC)—set a US$60- to $66- per-share price range for its scheduled initial public offering (IPO), the final price of which would be determined after an international roadshow to gauge the investor interest in Alibaba shares to shareholders. On 18 September 2014, Alibaba's IPO priced at US$68, raising US$21.8 billion for the company and investors. Alibaba was the biggest US IPO in history, bigger than Google, Facebook, and Twitter combined. On 19 September 2014, Alibaba's shares (BABA) began trading on the NYSE at an opening price of $92.70 at 11:55 am EST. On 22 September 2014, Alibaba's underwriters announced their confirmation that they had exercised a greenshoe option to sell 15% more shares than originally planned, boosting the total amount of the IPO to $25 billion.

Alibaba and the underwriters of its IPO were sued in a California superior court in a consolidated class action lawsuit. The lawsuit was filed in October 2015 on behalf of investors who purchased Alibaba's American depositary shares alleging violations of the Securities Act. Alibaba reached a settlement agreement in December 2018, subject to court approval, in which it agreed to pay $75 million to settle the lawsuit.

In January 2017, Alibaba and the International Olympic Committee jointly announced an $800 million deal that would last until 2028 in where the company would sponsor the Olympic Games. In September 2018, Jack Ma, the main founder of Alibaba, announced that he would step down as chairman in a year's time so he could focus on philanthropy. In response to the announcement, The Economist stated that Ma had a significant impact in China and worldwide via contributions and dedication to various businesses.

In May 2019, Bloomberg cited sources familiar with the matter as saying that Alibaba was considering raising $20 billion through a second listing in Hong Kong. On Tuesday, 10 September 2019, Jack Ma officially stepped down as the chairman of Alibaba, Daniel Zhang succeeded him at the head of the company. In September 2019, the municipal government of Hangzhou announced that it was boosting its monitoring of the private sector by embedding government officials in Alibaba and other companies.

In November 2020, The Wall Street Journal reported that Chinese Communist Party general secretary Xi Jinping personally scuttled Jack Ma's Ant Group IPO. At that time this was highlighted as the world's largest IPO suspension, sending a chilling warning to numerous entrepreneurs. Bo Zhuang, chief China economist at TS Lombard said that the suspension "forms part of a wider political drive as the leadership seeks to widen and consolidate its control over finance and technology". What followed was an unexpected Chinese government-released draft on 10 November 2020, which gives regulatory authorities a wider latitude to regulate their biggest tech enterprises.

On 24 December 2020, China launched an antitrust investigation into Alibaba Group regulators, in a crackdown on China's booming Internet space's anti-competitive behavior. In December 2020, the shares of Alibaba Group suffered a historic stock price crash to the lowest close in around 6 months, following the antitrust investigation into the company by Chinese regulators. In December 2020, China's State Administration for Market Regulation (SAMR) stated that it opened an investigation into Alibaba over monopolistic practices. The country's central bank, as well as three other regulators, confirmed in a separate statement that the affiliated Ant Group would also be summoned for discussions over "competition and consumer rights", where regulators instructed the company to return its focus to digital-payments. People's Daily, the official newspaper of the Central Committee of the Chinese Communist Party, endorsed the investigation shortly after the announcement, claiming the investigation to be "an important step in strengthening antimonopoly oversight in the internet sphere". As a result, from the antitrust probe, Alibaba lost nearly all of its stock-market gains in 2020, from $859 billion to $586 billion, by the end of December. Jack Ma, co-founder of both Alibaba and Ant Group, vanished from public view when Ant's IPO was suspended in early November, but resurfaced in January 2021 in a 50-second video, appearing briefly via video link at the digitally facilitated Rural Teacher Initiative. As of February 2021, he has yet to be seen in public. The video appearance caused Alibaba stock to jump more than 7%.

In February 2021, Alibaba sold $5 billion in bonds, the company's third large sale of dollar bonds, issuing four sets priced to yield between 2.143% and 3.251%. The four sets of bonds were $1.5 billion of both 10 year and 30 year debt along with $1 billion of bonds due in 20 and 40 years. The 20 year bonds were designated as sustainability notes.

On April 9, 2021, as part of a Chinese crackdown on big tech, SAMR issued a $2.8 billion fine against Alibaba for anti-competitive practices and ordered Alibaba to file self-examination and compliance reports to the SAMR for three years. This amounted to 12% of its 2020 net profit. Critics say the move tightens the Chinese's governments control of tech companies.

On 11 November 2021, it was reported that over the course of its 11-day Singles' Day sales extravaganza, Chinese e-commerce giant Alibaba Group Holding received a record 540.3 billion yuan (S$114.4 billion) in orders, a 14 percent increase over the previous year.

In July 2022, the SEC added Alibaba to a list of companies facing delisting from U.S. stock exchanges if its auditors remain unable to examine Alibaba's books before 2024.

In December 2022, a state-owned enterprise of the China Internet Investment Fund, established by the Cyberspace Administration of China, took a 1 percent golden share investment in two Alibaba subsidiaries that control Youku and UCWeb.

Companies and affiliated entities

E-commerce and retail service platforms 

In 1999, Jack Ma launched the primary business of Alibaba, Alibaba.com, while working as an English teacher in Hangzhou. Alibaba.com later became the world's largest online B2B trading platform for small businesses as of 2014. Alibaba.com has three main services: the English language portal Alibaba.com, which handles sales between importers and exporters from more than 240 countries and regions, the Chinese portal 1688.com, which manages domestic B2B trade in China, and transaction-based retail website AliExpress.com (全球速卖通), which allows smaller buyers to buy small quantities of goods at wholesale prices. Alibaba.com went public at the Hong Kong Stock Exchange in 2007, and was delisted again in 2012. In 2013, 1688.com launched a direct channel that was responsible for $30 million in daily transaction value.

In 2003, Alibaba launched Taobao Marketplace (淘宝网), offering a variety of products for retail sales. Taobao grew to become China's largest C2C online shopping platform and later became the second most visited web site in China, according to Alexa Internet. Taobao's growth was attributed to offering free registration and commission-free transactions using a free third-party payment platform. Advertising made up 75 percent of the company's total revenue, allowing it to break even in 2009. In 2010, Taobao's profit was estimated to be ¥1.5 billion (US$235.7 million), which was only about 0.4 percent of their total sales figure of ¥400 billion (US$62.9 billion) that year, way below the industry average of 2 percent, according to iResearch estimates. According to Zhang Yu, the director of Taobao, between 2011 and 2013, the number of stores on Taobao with annual sales under ¥100 thousand increased by 60%; the number of stores with sales between ¥10 thousand and ¥1 million increased by 30%, and the number of stores with sales over ¥1 million increased by 33%.

In April 2008, Taobao introduced a spin-off, Taobao Mall (淘宝商城, later Tmall.com), an online retail platform to complement the Taobao C2C portal, offering global brands to an increasingly affluent Chinese consumer base. It became the eighth most visited web site in China as of 2013. In 2012, Tmall.com later changed its Chinese name to Tianmao (天猫, "sky cat"), reflecting off of Tmall's Chinese pronunciation. In March 2010, Taobao launched the group shopping website Juhuasuan (聚划算), offering "flash sales", which are products that are available at a discount for only a fixed time period. In October 2010, Taobao beta-launched eTao, a comparison shopping website that offers search results from mostly Chinese online shopping platforms, including product searches, sales and coupon searches. According to the Alibaba Group web site, eTao offers products from Amazon China, Dangdang, Gome, Yihaodian, Nike China, and Vancl, as well as Taobao and Tmall. As part of a restructuring of Taobao by Alibaba, these spin-offs became separate companies in 2011, with Tmall and eTao becoming separate businesses in June and Juhuasuan becoming a separate business later in October.

In 2010, Alibaba launched AliExpress.com, an online retail service made up of mostly small Chinese businesses offering products to international online buyers. It is the most visited e-commerce platform in Russia. It allows small businesses in China to sell to customers all over the world, resulting in a wide variety of products. It might be more accurate to compare AliExpress to eBay, though, as sellers are independent; it simply serves as a host for other businesses to sell to consumers. Similar to eBay, sellers on Aliexpress can be either companies or individuals. It connects Chinese businesses directly with buyers. The main difference from Taobao is that it's aimed primarily at international buyers, mainly the US, Russia, Brazil and Spain.

In 2013, Alibaba and six large Chinese logistics companies (including SF Express) established a company called Cainiao for delivery of packages in China. This network gradually grew to 14 local logistics companies in 2014. In 2016, Alibaba's Taobao and Tmall, two of the world's largest and most popular online retail marketplaces, achieved a total transaction volume of 3 trillion yuan (US$478.6 billion). The company aims to double the transaction volume to 6 trillion yuan by 2020. , Taobao reached 580 million monthly active users, while Tmall achieved 500 million monthly active users. It is also rapidly expanding its e-commerce network abroad. Alibaba has also announced that it will invest 100 billion yuan over five years to build a global logistics network, underpinning an aggressive overseas expansion, and demonstrating Alibaba's commitment to building the most efficient logistics network in China and around the world. It is investing a further 5.3 billion yuan in Cainiao Logistics to boost its stake to 51 percent from 47 percent. The investment would value Cainiao, a joint venture of top Chinese logistics firms, at around US$20 billion.

 On 11 June 2014, Alibaba launched US shopping site 11 Main. The 11 Main marketplace hosts more than 1,000 merchants in categories such as clothing, fashion accessories and jewelry as well as interior goods and arts and crafts and it plans to keep adding more, said the company. On 23 June 2015, Alibaba announced that it is selling 11 Main to OpenSky, an online-marketplace operator based in New York.

In February 2015, Alibaba invests US$590 million in Meizu, acquiring an undisclosed minority stake.

In June 2015, Alibaba started a joint venture Koubei with its affiliate Ant Financial Group to tap China's fast-growing local services market, each investing approximately US$483 million into the business for an equal equity stake.

In April 2016, Alibaba announced that it intended to acquire a controlling interest in Lazada by paying $500 million for new shares and buying $500M worth of shares from existing investors. Lazada Group is a Singaporean e-commerce company founded by Rocket Internet in 2011. Lazada operates sites in Indonesia, Malaysia, the Philippines, Singapore, Thailand, and Vietnam. Its sites launched in March 2012, with a business model of selling inventory to customers from its own warehouses. In 2013 it added a marketplace model that allowed third-party retailers to sell their products through Lazada's site. Lazada features a wide product offering in categories ranging from consumer electronics to household goods, toys, fashion and sports equipment. In March 2018, Alibaba announced its plan to invest an additional $2 billion in the company, totaling a $4 billion investment. Alibaba also plans to appoint Alibaba co-founder Lucy Peng as Lazada's new CEO.
In October 2016, Alibaba launched Alitrip, later named Fliggy, an online travel platform that is designed as an online mall for brands such as airline companies and agencies. Fliggy set the target audience as younger generation and it strives to become a one-stop service when they plan their trips, particularly in overseas travel. On 7 August 2017, Alibaba Group and Marriott International hotel group announced a comprehensive strategic co-operation. Two companies will set up a joint venture company. Through the docking technology system and the superiority resources, Fliggy has Marriott hotel flagship store. It has the same function with Marriott Chinese website and Marriott mobile app to create the best global travel experience for consumers.

In 2016, the Office of the United States Trade Representative added Taobao back onto a list of notorious counterfeit platforms that includes the likes of torrent site The Pirate Bay. Alibaba denied wrongdoing and filed two lawsuits against the counterfeiters , but brands whose sales have been affected by the counterfeit products accused Alibaba of not doing enough.

In 2017, Alibaba started opening a chain of supermarkets, named Hema (盒马, lit. box horse), as part of the company's "new retail strategy," where customers can either order in the store or online for delivery in under 30 minutes. It offers a mobile app that recommends customers products based on data analytics. In addition, customers can have their groceries cooked to eat in the food court of the supermarket.

In October 2018, it was reported that Alibaba's Koubei have merged with online food delivery service platform Ele.me into a new local life service subsidiary. However, the newly formed Alibaba Local Life Service entity experienced major competition from local service giant Meituan, which is backed by Tencent, leading to rumours of planned layoffs in 2022.

In October 2020, Alibaba agreed to pay US$3.6 billion to take control of China's biggest hypermarket operator Sun Art from French billionaire Mulliez family. The deal doubled the group's stake in the hypermarket chain with a tootles ownership of 72%.

Gold Supplier membership
Alibaba.com offers a paid Gold Supplier membership to try to ensure that each seller is genuine; sellers' Gold Supplier status and the number of years it has been held are displayed. The supplier verification types and checks are listed on Alibaba.com's website, with more stringent checks for sellers outside China. While the majority of suppliers are reported to be genuine, there have been many cases of sellers, some with Gold Supplier status, seeking to defraud unsuspecting buyers. In February 2011, controversy ensued when Alibaba's corporate office admitted that it had granted the mark of integrity of its "China Gold Supplier" program to more than 2,000 dealers that had subsequently defrauded buyers; the firm's share price dropped "abruptly" after the announcement. A statement from the firm reported that Yan Limin, the general manager of Alibaba.com at the time, had been dismissed in March for "misconduct"; Phil Muncaster of UK's The Register additionally reported that "a further 28 employees had been involved in dodgy dealings".

As The Economist noted, the company's response has conflicting components: Alibaba's promulgated view that its corrective actions indicate its commitment to quality and integrity (where it contrasts itself with other scandal-associated Chinese business sectors), versus a damage control view suggesting that the subscription-driven, third-party verified "China Gold Supplier" program was endangered by diminished trust in its endorsement system, removing the incentive for global buyers to choose Alibaba as their business-to-business service, thus more broadly endangering Alibaba through impact on its brand and capabilities (the latter via the "defenestration of senior people"). The scandal was said to have placed the head of Alibaba Group, Jack Ma—who was described as having been furious over the scandal—in a position to personally fight to win back trust.

Cloud computing and artificial intelligence technology 
In conjunction with the company's 10th anniversary, Alibaba launched Alibaba Cloud in September 2009, aiming to build a cloud computing service platform, including e-commerce data mining, e-commerce data processing, and data customization. It has R&D centres and operators in Hangzhou, Beijing, Hong Kong, Singapore, Silicon Valley and Dubai. In July 2014, Alibaba Cloud entered into a partnership deal with Inspur. Alibaba Cloud is the largest high-end cloud computing company in China. In 2009, Alibaba acquired HiChina, the largest domain registration service and web hosting service company in China, and built it into Alibaba Cloud. On 28 July 2011, Alibaba Cloud released AliOS (formerly Yun OS and Aliyun OS), a Linux distribution designed for mobile devices. In the 2017 Computing Conference in Hangzhou, Alibaba launched AliGenie, a China-based open-platform intelligent personal assistant. It is currently used in the Tmall Genie smart speaker.

In 2018, Alibaba's Wanli Min presented City Brain, a technology geared towards urban solutions such as streamlining traffic, detecting accidents and improving transport efficiency.

On 27 July 2019, Alibaba unveiled a 64-bit RISC-V processor called the XuanTie-910 (Black Iron 910). It is a 12 nm 16-core with a clockrate of 2.5 GHz, and was designed by Alibaba's subsidiary T-Head (also known as Pingtouge). Alibaba claim the Xuantie-910 is faster than the ARM Cortex-A73 and is capable of 7.1 Coremark/MHz.

On 25 September 2019, Alibaba announced an AI accelerator called the Hanguang 800. The Hanguang 800 contains 17 billion transistors built with a 12 nm process and was designed by T-Head and DAMO Academy (Alibaba's research team). Alibaba claim it is capable of 78,563 images per second (IPS) inference and 500 IPS/W in ResNet-50. The Hanguang 800 will be available to be rented on Alibaba Cloud.

On 18 January 2022, Administration of the United States President Joe Biden started investigating Alibaba Cloud business's potential risk to the U.S. national security. This included scrutiny of storage facility of the U.S. clients' data by the provider and to determine whether the Chinese government can obtain access to the same.

Surveillance of Uyghurs 

In December 2020, The New York Times reported that Alibaba had developed and marketed facial recognition and surveillance software configured to detect Uyghur faces and those of other ethnic minorities in China. Alibaba responded that it was "dismayed to learn" that its Alibaba Cloud subsidiary had developed this feature, defending that the technology was developed "in a testing environment" and that it "was not deployed by any customer." However, IPVM reported in December 2020 that Alibaba refused to provide any proof the Uyghur recognition feature was just a "test" or "trial" and that Alibaba's own website showed Uyghur recognition as a live feature.

FinTech and online payment platforms 

In 2004, the Alibaba Group launched Alipay, a third-party online payment platform. It also provides an escrow service, in which buyers can verify whether they are happy with goods they have bought before releasing money to the seller. Alibaba Group spun off Alipay in 2010 in a controversial move. According to analyst research report, Alipay has the biggest market share in China with 300 million users and control of just under half of China's online payment market in February 2014. In 2013, Alipay launched a financial product platform called Yu'ebao (余额宝). Alipay partnered with the Tianhong Asset Management to launch it to the general public. In 2015, Alibaba announced that they will introduce a system that can be paid by recognizing the owner's face. On 16 October 2014, the Alipay company was re-branded as Ant Financial Services (now Ant Group).

One of the factors for Alibaba's success in this platform is the company's quick and reliable payment system, where it offers several types of payment systems such as credit card, debit card, Alipay, Quick-pay, and online banking. These payment systems help to cope with simultaneous cash flow transactions with ease and convenience. Ant Financial was ranked sixth in Fortune's Change the World list, recognized for the positive green environmental impact of its Ant Forest, the world's largest platform for tracking individuals' carbon footprints. Ant Financial and its partners have achieved considerable success in the reduction of  emissions. Ant Financial is the highest valued fintech company in the world, and the world's most valuable unicorn (start-up) company, with a valuation of US$150 billion.

Entertainment services 
Alibaba created a new live entertainment business unit under its Digital Media and Entertainment Group which focuses on ticketing, content creation and live experiences, bringing its entertainment ticketing platform Damai and its content creation and technology units MaiLive and Maizuo under one roof. It aims to provide a platform for live events (e.g. concerts, plays, esports and sports events), as well as supporting content partners and leveraging Alibaba's data capability for offline shows. It also provides the online digital distribution service 9Apps, which hosts downloadable content and applications.

In March 2014, Alibaba agreed to acquire a controlling stake in ChinaVision Media Group for $804 million. The two firms announced they would establish a strategic committee for potential future opportunities in online entertainment and other media areas. The company was renamed Alibaba Pictures Group. In March 2015, Alibaba Group launched AliMusic as its music division. Xiami Music and Tiantian Music are two of music steaming APP owned by AliMusic. AliMusic named Gao Xiaosong as the chairman and Song Ke as chief executive officer in July 2015. In 2017, Tencent Music has expected $10bn IPO by signing a rights deal with Alibaba, strengthening its position within the important Chinese market. Under the terms of the deal Alibaba will gain the right to stream music from international labels such as Sony Music, Universal Music Group and YG Entertainment, which already have exclusive deals with Tencent, in return for offering to its catalogue from Rock Records, HIM International Music and so on. In April 2014, Alibaba and Yunfeng Capital, a private equity company controlled by Alibaba's founder, Jack Ma, agreed to acquire a combined 18.5 percent stake in Youku Tudou, which broadcasts a series of popular television programs and other videos over the Internet.

In August 2020, Ant Financial, a subsidiary of Alibaba, launched the IPO program, valued at US$200 billion.

Internet services 
In 2004, the Alibaba Group released Aliwangwang, an instant messaging software service for interactions between customer and online sellers. By 2014, there are 50 million Aliwangwang users, making it the second-largest instant messaging tool in China. In October 2013, the Alibaba's chairman Jack Ma announced that the Alibaba Group would no longer use Tencent's messaging application WeChat, and would henceforth promote its own messaging application and service, Laiwang. In April 2014, Alibaba Group and UCWeb, a Chinese provider of mobile internet software technology and services, launched Shenma (神马), a mobile-only search engine, as part of a joint venture. Later in June, the Alibaba Group acquired UCWeb, with an international product portfolio that includes a mobile browsing service (UC Browser), app and game distribution platforms (9Apps and 9Game), a mobile traffic platform (UC Union) and UC News that primarily caters to all types of news in the India market (as an aggregator) among others. Alibaba's Y Projects Business Unit developed the Xuexi Qiangguo app, which is used to teach Xi Jinping Thought.

In October 2005, Alibaba Group formed a strategic partnership with Yahoo! and acquired Yahoo! China, a Chinese portal previously launched on 24 September 1999 that focuses on Internet services like news, email, and search. In April 2013, Alibaba Group announced that, as part of the agreement to buy back the Yahoo! Mail stake, that they would suspend technological support for China Yahoo! Mail service and begin migration of Yahoo! China Mail accounts. Several options were offered to users to make the transition as smooth as possible, and Yahoo! China users had four months to migrate their accounts to the Aliyun mail service, the Yahoo! Mail service in the United States, or to another third-party e-mail provider of the user's choice. Yahoo! China closed its mail service on 19 August 2013. E-mails sent to Yahoo! China accounts could be forwarded to an Alimail box until 31 December 2014. Users were also allowed to transfer e-mail accounts to yahoo.com or any other e-mail service. It is estimated there are no more than a million users with Yahoo! Mail for China and chances are they also own other e-mail accounts.

In 2014, Alibaba Group founded DingTalk, an enterprise communication and collaboration platform. Also known as Ding Ding, the app was developed as part of efforts to compete with rival Tencent's WeChat. DingTalk is managed by Alibaba's cloud computing division.

Others 
In 2014, Alibaba and Yunfeng Capital, a private equity firm, launched AliHealth when the two companies bought a 54% stake in CITIC 21CN for HK$1.33 billion (US$171 million). It positions itself as a pharmaceutical e-commerce business and medical services. In the same year, Alibaba acquired Chinese map supplier AutoNavi. In April 2015, the group also reached an agreement to transfer its online B2C pharmacy, Tmall Medical (yao.Tmall.com), to AliHealth. The integration provides consumers a wide range of pharmaceutical and health products available in China. In 2015, Alibaba later launched its Shanghai-based sports division, AliSports, after a consolidation of some of the parent company's existing business units. The new company's operations encompass television and digital sports rights, event operation, venue commercialization, copyright, media, business development, gaming, and ticketing. AliSports secured exclusive title sponsorship of the FIFA Club World Cup from 2015 to 2022. The company announced a Champion of Champions rugby sevens tournament in 2017, to be played in Shanghai for the highest prize money ever offered in the sport.

In December 2015, Alibaba agreed to acquire the South China Morning Post and other media assets belonging to the group for a consideration of $266 million. Although Alibaba promised editorial independence, vice-chairman Joseph Tsai said that Alibaba believes that "the world needs a plurality of views when it comes to China coverage. China's rise as an economic power and its importance to world stability is too important for there to be a singular thesis." The acquisition attracted media concerns over what this would mean for the newspaper's coverage.

Other subsidiaries of Alibaba include Hangzhou Ali Venture Capital and Alibaba Entrepreneurs Fund. Hangzhou Ali Venture Capital (杭州阿里创业投资) is a company 80% owned by Jack Ma and another manager of Alibaba. For regulatory purpose, Alibaba Group did not own the company directly, but by pleading. It was considered as a subsidiary and/or consolidated entity of Alibaba Group. Ali Venture Capital is a shareholder of Beijing Enlight Media and a domestic shareholder of China Unicom. The Alibaba Entrepreneurs Fund is a non-profit making initiative launched by Alibaba Group in 2015.

Alibaba also has invested in more than ten startups in Hong Kong including DayDayCook, GoGoVan, WeLend and Qupital. In 2019, Alibaba launched China-Russia flights in collaboration with Russian Post to assure fast shipping of products.

Corporate governance
Alibaba's main co-founder Jack Ma is the former executive chairman of the Alibaba Group from its creation to 10 September 2019. The current executive chairman is Daniel Zhang, who succeeded Ma on 10 September 2019, and is also Alibaba's CEO since 2015. Joseph Tsai is Alibaba's executive vice-chairman since 2013. J. Michael Evans is Alibaba's president since 2015. The board of directors of Alibaba includes top management Jack Ma, Joseph Tsai, Daniel Zhang, and J. Michael Evans, and director Eric Jing, plus independent directors such as Chee Hwa Tung, Walter Kwauk, Börje E. Ekholm, and Wan Ling Martello, as well as Yahoo! co-founder and former CEO Jerry Yang. Masayoshi Son (founder and CEO of SoftBank) formerly served on the firm's board before stepping down in 2020. Besides Ma, Tsai, Zhang, and Evans, senior management also includes Toby Xu (Chief financial officer) Judy Tong (Chief human resources officer), Jeff Zhang (Chief technology officer and President of Alibaba Cloud Intelligence), Sophie Wu (Chief customer officer), Tim Steinert (General Counsel and Secretary), Jessie Zheng (Chief risk officer and CRGO/Chief Platform Governance Officer), Angel Zhao (Head of Alibaba Globalization Leadership Group), Chris Tung (Chief marketing officer), Trudy Dai (President of Wholesale Marketplaces), Fan Jiang (President of Taobao.com), and Jet Jing (President of Tmall.com).

Previously, Jack Ma served as the CEO of the Alibaba Group since its creation, but later stepped down in 2013, choosing Jonathan Lu as his successor. The Alibaba Group under Lu was performing well, though there were rumors that Ma was growing distrustful in Lu's ability to lead the company. Daniel Zhang, who served as COO of Alibaba under Lu, succeeded Lu as CEO in 2015. On 10 September 2018, Ma chose Zhang to succeed him as executive chairman of the Alibaba Group after his stepping down announcement, and this would go into effect in 1 year on 10 September 2019.

Since 2012, the Chinese Communist Party has had a Party Committee in place in the company and has over 2,000 party members as Alibaba employees. In 2019, the Chinese government began embedding officials inside major technology companies, including Alibaba.

Alibaba has been criticized for censorship on its platforms, this includes both censorship ordered by the Chinese government and self-censorship.

During the 2022 Russian invasion of Ukraine, Alibaba refused to join the international calls for withdrawal from the Russian market. Research from Yale University published on August 10, 2022 identifying how companies were reacting to Russia's invasion identified Alibaba in the worst category of "Digging in", meaning Defying Demands for Exit: companies defying demands for exit/reduction of activities.

Financial data

See also

 Variable interest entity
 Amazon

References

External links

 

 
Jack Ma
Chinese companies established in 1999
Chinese brands
Companies based in Hangzhou
Financial services companies established in 1999
Companies listed on the New York Stock Exchange
Companies listed on the Hong Kong Stock Exchange
Companies in the Hang Seng Index
Internet properties established in 1999
Silver Lake (investment firm) companies
Multinational companies headquartered in China
2014 initial public offerings
Electric vehicle manufacturers of China